The Thrifty Food Plan (TFP) is one of four USDA-designed food plans specifying categories and amounts of foods to provide adequate nutrition.  The other plans are known as the Low-Cost, Moderate-Cost, and Liberal food plans.  Each plan specifies a number of pounds per week for each of 58 food categories for different age groups, for men, women, and children.         

The TFP is used as the basis for designing Food Stamp Program benefits. It is the cheapest food plan and is calculated monthly using data collected for the consumer price index (CPI).  It is not the same as the food components of the CPI. The monthly cost of the TFP used for the Food Stamp Program represents a national average of expenditures (four-person household consisting of an adult couple and two school-age children) adjusted for other household sizes through the use of a formula reflecting economies of scale. For food stamp purposes, the TFP as priced each June sets maximum benefit levels for the fiscal year beginning the following October.

References 

{{CRS|article = Report for Congress: Agriculture: A Glossary of Terms, Programs, and Laws, 2005 Edition|url = https://digital.library.unt.edu/ark:/67531/metacrs7246/m1/1/high_res_d/97-905_2005Jun16.pdf

Supplemental Nutrition Assistance Program
Federal assistance in the United States